Jacob Hecht may refer to:

 Chic Hecht (Mayer Jacob Hecht, 1928–2006), U.S Senator and U.S. Ambassador
 Jacob J. Hecht (died 1990), Chabad rabbi, educator, writer and radio commentator